Beach Halt railway station was an unlisted stop just south of Lisfannon Golf Course in County Donegal, Ireland.

The station opened in 1939 on the Londonderry and Lough Swilly Railway line from Londonderry Graving Dock to Carndonagh.

It closed for passengers on 6 September 1948.

Routes

References

Disused railway stations in County Donegal
Railway stations opened in 1939
Railway stations closed in 1948
1939 establishments in Ireland
1948 disestablishments in Ireland
Railway stations in the Republic of Ireland opened in the 20th century